Diduga flavicostata is a moth of the family Erebidae first described by Snellen in 1879. It is found on Java, as well as in Australia (the Northern Territory), India, Sri Lanka, Myanmar, Malaysia, China (Jiangxi, Taiwan, Fujian, Guangxi, Hainan, Sichuan, Yunnan) and Japan.

Description
Antennae of male ciliated. Head, collar and tegulae are bright yellowish. Thorax and forewings are dark greyish, where forewings possess bright yellow costal area irrorated with a few black scales. Lower edge is waved. Costa black near the base and black specks on antemedial and postmedial. There is a marginal, bright yellow band with a pale waved inner edge. Cilia orange yellowish. Abdomen and hindwings are paler.

References

Nudariina
Moths of Japan
Moths described in 1879